Absconditella viridithallina is a species of crustose lichen in the family Stictidaceae. Found in South America, it was formally described as a new species in 2018 by lichenologists Klaus Kalb and André Aptroot. The specific epithet refers to the olive-green colour of the thallus. The lichen is known to occur in montane forests of Brazil and Venezuela, where it grows on bark and on wood. Similar species in genus Absconditella include A. delutula and A. termitariicola, both of which have longer ascospores and smaller algal cells.

References

Ostropales
Lichen species
Lichens described in 2018
Lichens of Venezuela
Taxa named by André Aptroot
Taxa named by Klaus Kalb
Lichens of Southeast Brazil